Ludwig is a German name, deriving from Old High German Hludwīg, also spelled Hluotwīg. Etymologically, the name can be traced back to the reconstructed Proto-Germanic name *hlūdawiganaz, which is composed of two elements: *hlūdaz ("loud, famous") and *wiganą ("to battle, to fight") respectively,  the resulting name meaning "famous warrior" or "famous in battle".

Notable people with the name include:

People
Note: Individuals may appear in more than one subsection.

German nobles
 Ludwig I, count of Württemberg (1143–1158)
 Ludwig II, count of Württemberg (1158–1181)
 Ludwig I, count of Württemberg-Urach (1419–1450)
 Ludwig II, count of Württemberg-Urach (1450–1457)
 Ludwig IV, landgrave of Thuringia (1200–1227)
 Ludwig I of Bavaria, king of Bavaria (1825–1848)
 Ludwig II of Bavaria, king of Bavaria (1864–1886)
 Ludwig III of Bavaria, last king of Bavaria (1913–1918)
 Ludwig V (disambiguation)
 Ludwig IV, Grand Duke of Hesse and by Rhine (1877–1892)

Architects
 Ludwig Levy, German architect
 Ludwig Mies van der Rohe, German-American architect

Artists
 Ludwig Mestler, Austrian artist noted for his watercolor painting
 Ernst Ludwig Kirchner, German painter and printmaker
 Ludwig Merwart, Austrian painter and graphic artist
 Ludwig Richter, German painter

Authors and poets
 Ludwig Bemelmans, American author and children's book writer and illustrator
 Ludwig Thoma, German author
 Ludwig Tieck, German poet
 Ludwig Uhland, German poet

Composers, conductors and musicians
 Ludwig van Beethoven (1770–1827), German composer and pianist
 Ludwig Göransson, Swedish composer, conductor, and record producer
 Ludwig Minkus, Austrian composer and violin virtuoso
 Ludwig Spohr (1784–1859), German composer, violinist and conductor

Philosophers
 Ludwig Feuerbach (1804–1872), German philosopher and anthropologist
 Ludwig Wittgenstein, Austrian philosopher

Politicians
 Ludwig von Cobenzl (1753–1809), Austrian Habsburg diplomat and politician
 Ludwig Erhard, West German chancellor
 Ludwig Mecklinger (1919–1994), East German politician and academic
 Ludwig Scotty, president of Nauru

Scientists
 Ludwig Aschoff, German physician and pathologist
 Ludwig von Bertalanffy (1901–1972), Austrian-born biologist
 Ludwig Binswanger, Swiss psychiatrist
 Ludwig Boltzmann, Austrian physicist
 Ludwig Feuerbach (1804–1872), German anthropologist and philosopher
 Ludwig von Mises, Austrian economist
 Ludwig Mond, German chemist
 Ludwig Prandtl, German physicist
 Ludwig Reichenbach, German botanist
 Ludwig Schläfli, Swiss geometer

Soldiers
 Ludwig Beck, German World War II general involved in the 20 July plot to assassinate Hitler
 Ludwig von Benedek, Austrian general (Feldzeugmeister) of Hungarian descent
 Ludwig Crüwell, German World War II general
 Ludwig Kübler, German General der Gebirgstruppe
 Ludwig Plagge (1910–1948), German SS officer at Auschwitz, Buchenwald and Majdanek concentration camps executed for war crimes
 Ludwig Runzheimer, German Nazi Gestapo officer executed for war crimes

Others
 Ludwig W. Adamec (1924–2019), American academic and historian
 Ludwig Ahgren, American live streamer
 Ludwig von Erlichshausen (1410–1467), Grand Master of the Teutonic Knights
 Ludwig Fischer (1905–1947), German Nazi lawyer and government official executed for war crimes
 Ludwig Gehre, German resistance fighter during World War II
 Ludwig Gumplowicz (1838–1909), Polish sociologist, jurist, historian, and political scientist
 Ludwig Leichhardt, Prussian explorer
 Ludwig Müller, leader of the Protestant Reich Church
 Ludwig Ingwer Nommensen, German Lutheran missionary to Sumatra who also translated the New Testament into the native Batak language
 Ludwig Ortiz, Venezuelan judoka
 Ludwig Rödl, German chess master
 Ludwig Roselius (1874–1943), German coffee baron and company founder
 Ludwig Rübekeil, German philologist
 Ludwig Trepte, German actor

Fictional characters
 Ludwig Von Drake, in Walt Disney cartoons and comic books
 Ludwig Von Koopa, one of the Koopalings from the Mario franchise
 Ludwig, in the anime series Axis Powers Hetalia
 Ludwig, in the video game Bloodborne
 Ludwig, the villain of the former Busch Gardens Williamsburg attraction The Curse of Darkastle

See also
 Ludwig (surname)
 Lothar
 Louis (given name), alternate version of the name
 Robert, name with a similar meaning

References

German masculine given names